Coffee Run Mission Site, also known as Coffee Run Church and St. Mary's Church, is a historic mission church site and national historic district located at Hockessin, New Castle County, Delaware. It encompasses two contributing buildings, both now demolished, and one contributing site. They were the Father Kenney House and stone barn with frame addition. The house was built in 1812, and was a two-story, three bay stone dwelling with a cross-gable roof.  The Coffee Run cemetery is the burial ground of the first Catholic church in Delaware. It measures approximately 66 feet by 183 feet and includes over 50 carved headstones and 12 uncut stone markers. Located at the cemetery is a small cinder block building, which contains an altar, and stands at the site of the original log mission church built about 1790. It was the first Catholic church in Delaware out of which grew the present Roman Catholic Diocese of Wilmington. The house was demolished in March 2010 following an arson. The barn, also affected by arson, remained mostly intact but in a decaying condition. Trinity Community Church planned to restore it and incorporate it into a new church on the site, but discovered that the mortar was no longer sound. The barn was demolished in 2016 and the stone saved for reuse in the facade of the new church.

It was listed on the National Register of Historic Places in 1973.

References

External links

 New Castle, Delaware Community History and Archaeology Program, "Pioneer Catholic church nears 200th anniversary," Brandywine Crossroads, September 25, 1986
 

History of Catholicism in the United States
Churches on the National Register of Historic Places in Delaware
Historic districts on the National Register of Historic Places in Delaware
Houses in New Castle County, Delaware
National Register of Historic Places in New Castle County, Delaware
Cemeteries on the National Register of Historic Places in Delaware